East Branch Rausch Creek is a tributary of Rausch Creek in Schuylkill County, Pennsylvania, in the United States. The creek is impacted by metals, pH, and siltation due to abandoned mine drainage and resource extraction. It drains an area between two mountains: Good Springs Mountain and Big Lick Mountain. There are also two mine pools in the watershed.

The main land use in the watershed of East Branch Rausch Creek is deciduous forest. However, disturbed land is the second-largest land use and accounts for the significant majority of the sediment loading in the creek. As of 2001, there are seven active mining permits in its watershed.

Course
East Branch Rausch Creek begins in a valley on a mountain in Porter Township. It flows north for a few tenths of a mile before turning westreceiving an unnamed tributary from the rightand then northwest, soon crossing a road and entering Hegins Township. Here, the creek begins flowing in a roughly westerly or west-northwesterly direction through a larger valley for several tenths of a mile before heading in a southwesterly direction. After a short distance, it crosses a road and turns west for a short distance before turning west-northwest. Several tenths of a mile further downstream, the creek joins West Branch Rausch Creek to form Rausch Creek.

Hydrology
Reaches of East Branch Rausch Creek are designated as impaired waterbodies. The causes of impairment in these reaches include siltation, metals, and pH, while the sources include abandoned mine drainage and resource extraction.

The pH of the creek near its mouth ranged from 4.5 to 6.8, with an average of 5.75.

The aluminum load requires a 95 percent reduction to meet the creek's total maximum daily load requirements, while the iron load requires a 94 percent reduction and the manganese load requires a 78 percent reduction. The acidity load requires an 84 percent reduction to meet its total maximum daily load requirements.

Other contributors include deciduous forest ( per year), cropland ( per year), high-intensity urban land ( per year), mixed forest ( annually), coniferous forest ( per year), and hay/pastures ( per year).

Geography and geology

The watershed of East Branch Rausch Creek is situated between Good Springs Mountain and Big Lick Mountain. The headwaters of the creek are in a large abandoned strip mine.

There are two mine pools in the watershed of East Branch Rausch Creek: the Good Spring No. 1 Pool and the Good Spring No. 3 Pool. The latter mine pool does not discharge into the watershed of East Branch Rausch Creek, but instead discharges via the Tracy Airway into the watershed of Good Spring Creek, a tributary of Swatara Creek.

Watershed and biology
East Branch Rausch Creek is entirely within the United States Geological Survey quadrangle of Tower City. The headwaters of the creek are about two miles (three kilometers) from the village of Good Spring, via State Route 4011.

The dominant land use in the watershed of East Branch Rausch Creek is forested land. Cropland occupies , mixed forest occupies , and deciduous forest occupies .

The drainage basin of East Branch Rausch Creek is designated as a Coldwater Fishery.

History
East Branch Rausch Creek was entered into the Geographic Names Information System on August 2, 1979. Its identifier in the Geographic Names Information System is 1173763.

As of 2001, there are seven permitted mining operations in the watershed of East Branch Rausch Creek. Only two of them have an NPDES permit, and only one of those two has an active discharge.

See also
West Branch Rausch Creek, the other named tributary of Rausch Creek
List of rivers of Pennsylvania

References

Rivers of Schuylkill County, Pennsylvania
Tributaries of Mahantango Creek
Rivers of Pennsylvania